A Star Is Born is a 2018 American musical romantic drama film produced and directed by Bradley Cooper (in his directorial debut) with a screenplay by Cooper, Eric Roth and Will Fetters. It stars Cooper, Lady Gaga, Dave Chappelle, Andrew Dice Clay and Sam Elliott, and follows an alcoholic musician (Cooper) who discovers and falls in love with a young singer (Gaga). It is the fourth filmed version of the story, after the original 1937 romantic drama and its 1954 and 1976 adaptations. Principal photography began at the Coachella Valley Music and Arts Festival in April 2017.

A Star Is Born premiered at the 75th Venice International Film Festival on August 31, 2018, and was theatrically released in the United States on October 5, 2018, by Warner Bros. Pictures. It was a critical and commercial success, grossing over $436million worldwide and receiving praise for Cooper, Gaga, and Elliott's performances and Cooper's direction, as well as the screenplay, cinematography, and music. The film received numerous accolades, including eight nominations for the 91st Academy Awards, among them Best Picture, Best Actor (Cooper), Best Actress (Gaga) and Best Supporting Actor (Elliott); it won Best Original Song for "Shallow". It also earned five nominations at the 76th Golden Globe Awards, including Best Motion Picture – Drama, and won Best Original Song for "Shallow".

The film's soundtrack sold over six million copies worldwide and received a total of four Grammy Award wins out of seven nominations, including nominations for Song of the Year two years in a row. Its lead single "Shallow" is one of the world's best-selling singles of all time. For her acting and soundtrack contributions on A Star Is Born, Gaga became the first woman in history to win an Academy Award, Grammy Award, BAFTA Award and Golden Globe Award in one single year.

Plot
43-year-old Jackson "Jack" Maine, a famous country rock singer privately battling an alcohol and drug addiction, plays a concert. His primary support is Bobby, his manager and older half-brother. After a show, Jack goes out for drinks and visits a drag bar where he witnesses a tribute performance to Édith Piaf by 31-year-old Ally, who works as a waitress and singer-songwriter. Jack is amazed by her performance, and they spend the night talking to each other, where Ally discusses her unsuccessful efforts in pursuing a professional music career. Ally shares with Jack some lyrics she has been working on, and he tells her she is a talented songwriter and should perform her material.

Jack invites Ally to his next show. Despite her initial refusal, she attends and, with Jack's encouragement, sings "Shallow" on stage with him. Jack invites Ally to go on tour with him, forming a romantic relationship. In Arizona, Ally and Jack visit the ranch where Jack grew up and where his father is buried, only to find that Bobby had sold the land, which was converted into a wind farm. Angered at his betrayal, Jack attacks Bobby, who subsequently quits as his manager. Before doing so, Bobby reveals that he did inform Jack about the sale, but Jack was too drunk to notice.

While on tour, Ally meets Rez, a record producer who offers her a contract. Although visibly bothered, Jack still supports her decision. Rez refocuses Ally away from country music and towards pop music. Jack misses one of Ally's performances after he passes out drunk in public; he recovers at the home of his best friend George "Noodles" Stone and later makes up with Ally. There he proposes to Ally with an impromptu ring made from a loop of a guitar string, and they are married that same day at a church ministered by a relative of Noodles.

During Ally's performance on Saturday Night Live, Bobby reconciles with Jack. Later, Ally and a drunken Jack fight over Ally's growing artistic success. Jack criticizes Ally's new image and music, as her success appears to be outpacing his recent decline in popularity. At the Grammy Awards, where Ally is nominated for three awards, a visibly intoxicated Jack performs a tribute to Roy Orbison. Later in the evening, Ally wins the Best New Artist award. When she goes up on stage to receive her award, a still-inebriated Jack staggers up to her, where he publicly wets himself and passes out. Ally's father, Lorenzo, berates a semi-conscious Jack while Ally attempts to help Jack sober up. Jack joins a rehabilitation program shortly thereafter. While recovering in rehab for about two months, Jack discloses to his counselor that he tried to commit suicide at age 12. He also mentions that he has hearing problems due to progressively worsening tinnitus.

Jack tearfully apologizes to Ally for his behavior. While returning home, Jack admits to Bobby that it was he whom he idolized and not their father. Ally asks Rez to bring Jack on her European tour, but Rez refuses, prompting Ally to cancel the remainder of the tour, so she can care for Jack. Later, while waiting at their home for Ally, Rez confronts Jack and accuses him of nearly ruining Ally's career, stating that Jack will certainly relapse again. That evening, Ally lies to Jack and tells him that her record label has canceled her tour, so she can focus on her second album. Jack promises he will come to her concert that night, but after Ally leaves, he hangs himself in their garage. Grief-stricken and inconsolable after Jack's suicide, Ally is visited by Bobby, who tells her that the suicide was Jack's fault and not hers. The closing scenes reveal a flashback of Jack working on a song about his love for Ally, which he never finished writing. Ally sings this song as a tribute to Jack, introducing herself for the first time as Ally Maine.

Cast
 Bradley Cooper as Jackson "Jack" Maine, an established singer-songwriter and alcoholic. He is Ally's mentor and husband.
 Lady Gaga as Ally Maine, a singer-songwriter who is discovered by Jack and later becomes his wife.
 Sam Elliott as Bobby Maine, Jack's older half-brother and manager.
 Rafi Gavron as Rez Gavron, a music producer and Ally's manager.
 Andrew Dice Clay as Lorenzo, Ally's father.
 Anthony Ramos as Ramon, Ally's friend.
 Dave Chappelle as George "Noodles" Stone, a retired musician and Jack's best friend.
 Drena De Niro as Paulette Stone, Noodles' wife.
 Greg Grunberg as Phil, Jack's driver.

Additionally, Shangela appears as the drag bar MC, Willam Belli as drag queen Emerald, and Ron Rifkin as Jackson's rehab therapist Carl. Barry Shabaka Henley appears as Little Feet, a veteran session musician. Rebecca Field portrays Gail, while Michael Harney portrays Wolfie, a friend of Lorenzo.  Lukas Nelson & Promise of the Real appear as Jackson's band. Members of the supergroup band include Don Was, Victor Indrizzo and Lenny Castro. Eddie Griffin appears as a local preacher and Luenell appears as a cashier. Marlon Williams, Brandi Carlile, Alec Baldwin, Halsey and Don Roy King cameo as themselves.

Production

Pre-production
Previous remakes of the original 1937 film included the 1954 musical and 1976 rock musical. Furthermore, the Bollywood romance film Aashiqui 2 (2013) was inspired by A Star Is Born but was not a remake. Development of a new adaptation dated as far back as the late 1990s with Will Smith the intended lead player. However, Smith's participation was nixed by his decision to star in Ali. In 2000, Jamie Foxx and Oliver Stone were rumoured to be seriously interested in remaking the movie, with Foxx first seeking out R&B singer Aaliyah and then rising actor Paul Walker for the leading duo roles. Lauryn Hill and Mariah Carey were also sought for the lead roles, and Alicia Keys turned down an offer to play the female lead in the film. Plans for the adaptation were shelved for several years.

In January 2011, it was announced that Clint Eastwood was in talks to direct Beyoncé in a third American remake of the film A Star Is Born (1937), with Bradley Cooper playing the male lead. However, the project was delayed on account of Beyoncé's pregnancy. In April 2012, writer Will Fetters told Collider that the script was inspired by Kurt Cobain.

Over the course of the film's development, talks with Christian Bale, Leonardo DiCaprio, Tom Cruise, Johnny Depp and Will Smith to play the male lead failed to come to fruition. Eastwood was interested in Esperanza Spalding to play the female lead. Jennifer Lopez, Rihanna, Shakira, Janelle Monáe, Selena Gomez, Demi Lovato and Kesha were also considered for the lead female role. On March 24, 2015, Warner Bros. announced that Cooper was in final talks to make his directorial debut with the film. Beyoncé was again in talks to join, though still unsigned. In order to secure his first directorial commitment and in lieu of receiving an upfront salary, Cooper took a back-end deal in order to get the film made, resulting in a $39.9 million salary.

Cooper revealed that originally he planned on only directing the film and did not want to star in it because he wanted to focus on directing. His first choice for the male lead was musician Jack White, but the studio rejected the idea. It was then that Cooper agreed to star in the movie as well. A major issue in the development process was Warner Bros.' reluctance to deal with Jon Peters, who held the rights to the material dating back to his producing the 1976 blockbuster but had become a pariah due to his behaviour; while the studio made a deal with him for the rights, they made sure his name was not listed in the credits (including those that were submitted for the Oscar nomination bids which the movie earned), and Bradley Cooper bluntly stated that a major reason his goal of having a happy and respectful set was met was that "Jon wasn't here." Incidentally, Cooper was cast as Peters in Paul Thomas Anderson's comedy drama Licorice Pizza (2021).

Casting
Cooper became the male lead while in final talks to make his directorial debut at the end of March 2016. On August 16, 2016, it was reported that Lady Gaga had officially become attached and the studio had green-lit the project to begin production early 2017. On November 9, 2016, it was reported that Ray Liotta was in talks to join the film in the role of the manager to Cooper's character, though he ultimately was not involved. On March 17, 2017, Sam Elliott joined the film, with Andrew Dice Clay entering negotiations to play Lorenzo, the father of Lady Gaga's character. Clay was reportedly selected over Robert De Niro, John Turturro and John Travolta. In April 2017, Rafi Gavron, Michael Harney, and Rebecca Field also joined the cast. In May, Dave Chappelle was cast in the film. In April 2018, it was announced that Halsey would have a small role.

Filming

Filming began on April 17, 2017. PIX System was used in the production of the film. Matthew Libatique commented on the stylized photography and lighting motifs used for the film stating: "Every decision about palette, the style in which we shot, would happen as we (Cooper and I) went along and discussed other things, like tone or authenticity. Or what the film was about. We both leaned into very early on that this was ultimately a love story… that was our objective and our best achievement."

Music

After seeing him perform at Desert Trip festival, Cooper approached Lukas Nelson (son of country music singer Willie Nelson) and asked him to help work on the film. Nelson agreed and wrote several songs, which he sent to the producers. Nelson subsequently met Lady Gaga and began writing songs with her and she, in turn, provided backing vocals on two tracks on his self-titled 2017 album. The soundtrack, performed by Gaga and Cooper, was released on October 5, 2018, by Interscope Records. The studio announced that the album "features 19 songs in a wide range of musical styles + 15 dialogue tracks that will take you on a journey that mirrors the experience of seeing the film."

Release

Theatrical
A Star Is Born had its world premiere at the 75th Venice International Film Festival on August 31, 2018. The acclaimed movie also screened at the Toronto International Film Festival, the San Sebastián International Film Festival, and the Zurich Film Festival in September 2018. The film was theatrically released in the United States on October 5, 2018, distributed by Warner Bros. Pictures, after having initially been set for release on September 28, 2018, and then rescheduled to May 18, 2018, before being pushed back to October. The studio spent an estimated $110million promoting the film.

Starting December 7, 2018, the film had a limited release in IMAX theaters across the United States and Canada. On February 28, 2019, the film was re-released in more than 1,150 US theaters with an extra twelve minutes of additional footage. Named as the special "encore" edition, it contained extended performances of songs like "Black Eyes" and "Alibi" from the soundtrack, an a cappella performance of "Shallow" by Gaga as well as her singing "Is That Alright?" during the wedding sequence of Ally and Jack. Extra footage also contained Cooper singing "Too Far Gone" in a recording studio, and Jack and Ally writing a song titled "Clover" together.

Home media
The film was available for digital download through retailers on January 15, 2019, followed by its release on Blu-ray, DVD and 4K Ultra HD Blu-ray on February 19. The home video release features 10 minutes of never-before-seen musical performances by Cooper and Gaga, and jam recording sessions of songs like "Midnight Special", "Is That Alright?" and "Baby What You Want Me to Do". A behind-the-scenes short feature, "The Road to Stardom: Making A Star Is Born", was also included along with music videos for four of the songs from the soundtrack: "Shallow", "Always Remember Us This Way", "Look What I Found" and "I'll Never Love Again". The 4K Blu-ray format has Dolby Vision high-dynamic-range video and remixed Dolby Atmos sound that was tailored specifically for home viewing systems. In April 2019, Warner Bros. Home Entertainment announced the release of A Star Is Born: Special Encore Edition for June 4. The release includes the extended and theatrical cuts of the film. Unlike the first home media release, this version did not receive a 4K Ultra HD release.

Reception

Box office
A Star Is Born grossed $215.3million in the United States and Canada, and $220.9million in other territories, for a total worldwide gross of $436.2million, against a production budget of $36million. Deadline Hollywood calculated the net profit of the film to be $178.1million, when factoring together all expenses and revenues, making it the tenth most profitable release of 2018.

In the United States and Canada, A Star Is Born grossed $1.35million from select Tuesday and Wednesday night screenings, and $15.8million on its first day, including $3.2million from Thursday night previews. It went on to debut to $42.9million for the weekend and finished second at the box office, behind fellow newcomer Venom. The film remained in second place in its second, third and fourth weekends, grossing a respective $28million, $19.3million and $14.1million. In the film's tenth weekend of release, following the announcement of its five Golden Globe nominations, the film made $2.5million (up 38% from the previous week), including $800,000 from a limited IMAX run. In the film's 17th week of release, following its eight Oscar nominations, it was added back to an additional 777 theaters (for a total of 1,192) and made $1.3million, an increase of 107% from the previous weekend. The weekend following its Best Original Song win at the Oscars, the film was added to 490 theaters (for a total of 1,235) and made $1.9million, a 209% increase from the previous weekend.

Outside North America, the film was released concurrently in 31 other countries, and made $14.2million in its opening weekend; its largest markets were the United Kingdom ($5.3million), France ($2.1million) and Germany ($1.9million). Additional countries followed, with Japan not seeing a release until December 21. The international box office for the film was substantial by the end of October 2018 despite being outpaced by the film Venom at the foreign box office. Variety magazine summarized the international performance stating: "A Star Is Born continues to do monster business of its own. The acclaimed musical drama starring Bradley Cooper and Lady Gaga generated an impressive $22.8 million from 75 overseas markets, bringing its tally to $74.7 million overseas and $201 million globally. A Star Is Born opened in Australia with $4.7 million in 536 venues, as well as Hong Kong with $629,000 in 58 locations. Top holdovers include the United Kingdom ($3.9 million on 846 screens), Italy ($1.5 million on 614 screens), and France ($1.5 million on 353 screens)".

Critical response

 On Metacritic, the film has a weighted average score of 88 out of 100, based on 60 critics, indicating "universal acclaim". Audiences polled by CinemaScore gave the film an average grade of "A" on an A+ to F scale, while PostTrak reported film-goers gave it a 90% positive score.

Alonso Duralde of TheWrap gave the film a positive review, saying, "Cooper and Lady Gaga are dynamite together; this is a story that lives and dies by the central relationship and the instant chemistry that must blossom between them, and these two have it in spades," and praised the musical numbers, describing them as "electrifying". Owen Gleiberman of Variety lauded Cooper's directing, co-writing and acting, and called the film "a transcendent Hollywood movie". Leah Greenblatt of Entertainment Weekly gave the film a B+ and singled out Gaga's performance, saying that she "deserves praise for her restrained, human-scale performance as a singer whose real-girl vulnerability lands miles away from the glittery meat-dress delirium of her own stage persona." Stephanie Zacharek of Time magazine found the film superior to its previous iterations and similarly praised Cooper's direction, the writing, as well the performances and chemistry of Cooper and Gaga. She stated: "You come away feeling something for these people, flawed individuals who are trying to hold their cracked pieces of self together—or to mend the cracks of those they love," also describing Gaga's performance as a "knockout."

In his review for the Los Angeles Times, Justin Chang called the film "remarkable", and praised Cooper for his fresh take on the well-worn formula of 1937 film, as well his direction, the performances, writing, and the cinematography. Peter Travers of Rolling Stone gave the film 4.5 out of five stars, and deemed it as a "modern classic", hailing the performances of Cooper and Gaga, and Cooper's direction. He found the film's screenplay and the original songs "seamless" and "terrific", and also called the film a major Oscar contender of the year and one of the year's best films. Ann Hornaday of The Washington Post described the film as "lavishly delightful" and "earthly convincing", and added that it "offers a suitably jaundiced glimpse of starmaking machinery at its most cynical, but also its most thrilling and gratifying." She similarly praised Cooper's direction, the performances and chemistry of Cooper and Gaga, and the supporting performances, particularly Andrew Dice Clay and Sam Elliott. Writing for the Chicago Sun-Times, Richard Roeper described it as "electric and shatteringly powerful" and remarked the film as one of the best versions of all the remakes, as well one of the best movies of the year.

While praising the direction, acting and writing, Michael Phillips in the Chicago Tribune argues that A Star is Borns formula has always been very seductive to audiences, even when it has been written poorly, and Cooper's few missteps include being a bit of a scene hog. Admitting audiences love it, and he just liked it, Phillips drew attention to a skeptical review by Lindsey Romaine for Medium who criticized the story's marginalization of the Gaga character in dealing with Cooper's manipulative addict. She at least wanted a scene where Gaga's character processed her behavior of letting the addict boyfriend get away with it. Phillips argued that it is in part the skillful musicianship which gets audiences to blow past such flaws.

In 2021, The Guardian placed A Star Is Born on their list of "Remakes that Outshine the Originals."

Top ten lists 
A Star Is Born was listed on numerous critics' top ten lists for 2018, among them:

 1st Chris Wasser, Irish Independent
 1st Harry Fletcher, London Evening Standard
 1st Tom Gliatto, People
 1st Owen Gleiberman, Variety
 2nd Complex
 2nd Frank Scheck, The Hollywood Reporter
 2nd Peter Bradshaw, The Guardian
 2nd Johnny Oleksinski, New York Post
 2nd The New Zealand Herald
 2nd Peter Travers, Rolling Stone
 2nd Brian Truitt, USA Today
 2nd Peter Debruge, Variety
 3rd Christopher Orr, The Atlantic
 3rd Robbie Collin, The Telegraph
 4th David Sims, The Atlantic
 4th Uproxx
 6th Lindsey Bahr, Associated Press
 6th Richard Roeper, Chicago Sun-Times
 6th Pete Hammond, Deadline Hollywood
 6th Matthew Jacobs, HuffPost
 6th Olly Richards, NME
 6th Quinn Hough, RogerEbert.com
 7th The Independent
 7th Sam C. Mac, Slant
 7th Stephanie Zacharek, Time
 8th Empire
 8th Sheila O'Malley, RogerEbert.com
 8th Richard Lawson, Vanity Fair
 9th Noel Murray, The A.V. Club
 9th Mike Scott, The Times-Picayune
 10th Jon Frosch, The Hollywood Reporter
 10th Christy Lemire, RogerEbert.com
 10th Emily Yoshida, Vulture
 Top 10 (listed alphabetically, not ranked) IGN
 Top 10 (listed alphabetically, not ranked) Kenneth Turan, Los Angeles Times
 Top 10 (listed alphabetically, not ranked) NPR
 Top 10 (listed alphabetically, not ranked) Nell Minow, RogerEbert.com
 Top 10 (listed alphabetically, not ranked) Dana Stevens, Slate
 Top 10 (listed alphabetically, not ranked) Giles Hattersley, British Vogue
 Top 10 (listed alphabetically, not ranked) Joe Morgenstern, The Wall Street Journal

Accolades 

The film has won a number of awards and nominations. It was chosen by both the National Board of Review and American Film Institute as one of the Top 10 Films of 2018. The film received five nominations at the 76th Golden Globe Awards, including Best Motion Picture – Drama, and eight nominations at the 91st Academy Awards, including Best Picture, winning Best Original Song for "Shallow".

See also

 Lady Gaga videography
 List of Bradley Cooper performances
 List of directorial debuts
 List of films featuring the deaf and hard of hearing

References

External links

 
 
 
 
 
 
 

2018 films
2018 directorial debut films
2018 romantic drama films
2010s American films
2010s English-language films
2010s musical drama films
2010s romantic musical films
Remakes of American films
American musical drama films
American romantic drama films
American romantic musical films
BAFTA winners (films)
Cross-dressing in American films
Cultural depictions of Alec Baldwin
Films about brothers
Films about alcoholism
Films about substance abuse
Films about music and musicians
Films directed by Bradley Cooper
Films produced by Bradley Cooper
Films produced by Jon Peters
Films produced by Todd Phillips
Films set in Arizona
Films set in Los Angeles
Films shot in Los Angeles
Films that won the Best Original Song Academy Award
Films with screenplays by Eric Roth
IMAX films
Metro-Goldwyn-Mayer films
Musical film remakes
Warner Bros. films